Eyerly Aircraft Company was an amusement ride manufacturing company in Salem, Oregon, founded by Lee Eyerly in 1930. The company originally intended to design flight simulators for the aircraft industry but shifted to amusement rides after an early simulator, called Orientator, became a popular pay-per-ride attraction with the public. The company manufactured rides until 1985 and went bankrupt in 1990, following a fatal accident in 1988 that occurred on a ride built by the company.

Aircraft manufacturing 
Lee Eyerly founded Eyerly Aircraft Company in 1930 to manufacture two inexpensive ways to train pilots which he devised when the Great Depression hit. The first was the Whiffle Hen, a plane which only burned two US gallons (8 L) of fuel per hour of flight. The second was a ground-based flight training device patented under the name "Orientator". The Orientator consisted of a small airplane suspended in what looked like the tines of a giant tuning fork. Air from the electrically driven propeller passed over the wings and rudder, and the operator controlled the movements of the plane in a manner similar to a real aircraft. The Orientator was produced commercially and eventually renamed the Acroplane.

Amusement rides 
A salesman approached Eyerly about selling them to carnivals and parks as an amusement ride after noticing several Acroplanes stored on the lot outside Eyerly's shop. While Eyerly was initially skeptical, he agreed to a deal which led to selling about 50 Acroplanes as an amusement ride. The following year, Eyerly changed the company's focus from aircraft to amusement rides based on the successful sales. Eyerly developed and patented numerous amusement rides which would become staples of carnival midways, including The Loop-O-Plane (1933), the Roll-O-Plane, the Fly-O-Plane and the Rock-O-Plane (1947). Perhaps their most popular design was the Octopus, which resulted in later variations: the Spider and the Monster. Two of the company's kiddie carousel rides were the Midge-O-Racer and Bulgy the Whale.

Although Eyerly's manufacturing business became amusement rides, the name of the company remained Eyerly Aircraft Company.

A partial list of the Eyerly Aircraft Company rides and their locations follows.

Closure 
Eyerly Aircraft Company continued to produce amusement rides until 1985. A fatal accident occurred at a Florida fair in 1988, where an arm of an Octopus ride snapped along an existing crack that was paint-covered and missed in inspections. A 17-year-old female died of head injuries when the basket she was riding in collided with another as it fell to the ground. A wrongful death lawsuit was brought against the ride's owner and county fair operator for failure to properly inspect and reinforce the ride. In the wake of the lawsuit, Eyerly Aircraft filed for bankruptcy and closed its doors permanently in 1990. The intellectual property rights to their rides were later purchased by Oregon Rides Inc.

See also 

 Octopus (ride)

References 

Amusement ride manufacturers
Companies based in Salem, Oregon
1930 establishments in Oregon
Manufacturing companies established in 1930
Defunct manufacturing companies based in Oregon
Manufacturing companies disestablished in 1985
1985 disestablishments in Oregon